Men's Overall World Cup 1988/1989

In Men's Overall World Cup 1988/89 all results count. The parallel slalom did not count for the Overall World Cup. Marc Girardelli won his third Overall World Cup.

References
 fis-ski.com

World Cup
FIS Alpine Ski World Cup overall titles